Horsley Hall is a 17th-century country house, now in use as a hotel, near Stanhope, County Durham, England. It is a Grade II listed building.

The manor house at Horsley was built in the 17th century but much enlarged during the 18th century. In 1808 the estate was purchased by the Reverend Henry Hildyard of Stokesley, a member of a junior branch of the Hildyards of Patrington, Yorkshire (see Hildyard Baronets). The family carried out extensions and additions to the house during the 19th century to create the present three storey, eight bayed mansion.

Several members of the Hildyard family served as High Sheriff of Durham in 1850, 1863, 1900 and 1947.

The Hildyards sold the estate after the death of Edward Hildyard and moved to Yorkshire. After some years of neglect the house was refurbished and converted for use as a hotel.

References
  Photograph and architectural description of listed building

Grade II listed buildings in County Durham
Country houses in County Durham
Stanhope, County Durham